Panormus or Panormos was a harbour on the coast of ancient Megaris. 

Its site is located near the modern Psatha.

References

Populated places in ancient Megaris
Former populated places in Greece